Gershom Powers (July 11, 1789 – June 25, 1831) was an American lawyer, jurist, and law enforcement officer who served one term as a U.S. Representative from New York from 1829 to 1831.

Biography
Born in Croydon, New Hampshire, Powers attended the common schools and was largely self-taught.
He taught school in the town of Sempronius, New York, while attending the local law school, from which he graduated in 1810.
He was admitted to New York State Bar Association the same year and commenced practice in Auburn, New York.

He was appointed Warden of Auburn Prison from 1820 to 1823.
First judge of the court of common pleas of Cayuga County 1823–1828.

Congress 
Powers was elected as a Jacksonian to the Twenty-first Congress (March 4, 1829 – March 3, 1831).
He served as chairman of the Committee on District of Columbia (Twenty-first Congress).
He declined to be a candidate for renomination in 1830.

Later career and death 
He was appointed inspector of Auburn prison on April 2, 1830, and served until his death.
He died in Auburn, New York, June 25, 1831.
He was interred in North Street Cemetery.

Family 
He was married to Eliza Hatch (1800–1885), a half-sister of Gov. Enos T. Throop. In 1832, his widow married Judge William B. Rochester (1789–1838).

Sources

1789 births
1831 deaths
Wardens of the Auburn Correctional Facility
Jacksonian members of the United States House of Representatives from New York (state)
19th-century American politicians
People from Croydon, New Hampshire
Members of the United States House of Representatives from New York (state)